Capoterra  (from Latin Caput Terrae, "head of the Earth") is a town and comune in the Metropolitan City of Cagliari, Sardinia, Italy. At 2011 national census it had 24,017 inhabitants and is part of the Cagliari metropolitan area.

Economy is mostly based on services, although the tourism sector grew notably in the past decades.

Twin towns
 Peschiera del Garda, Italy

See also
Cagliari metropolitan area

References

External links

Populated coastal places in Italy